Gates is an unincorporated rural-recreational community in the Gates Valley of the Lillooet Country in the Southern Interior of British Columbia, Canada.  It is located about midway along the length of the Gates River, between the communities of Birken and D'Arcy.

References

Unincorporated settlements in British Columbia
Lillooet Country
Populated places in the Squamish-Lillooet Regional District